Bakhtiari or Bakhtiyari may refer to:

Places
Bakhtiari, Fars, a village in Fars Province, Iran
Bakhtiari, Yazd, a village in Yazd Province, Iran
Chaharmahal and Bakhtiari Province, Iran
Bakhtiari Dam, an arch dam under construction on the Bakhtiari River
Bakhtiari River in Iran

Other uses
Bakhtiari (surname), list of people with the surname
Bakhtiari dialect, spoken by Bakhtiari people
Bakhtiari people, a tribe of Iran
Bakhtiari rug, made by the Bakhtiari people

See also
 Bakhtiyarli, a village in Azerbaijan
 Bakhtiar (disambiguation)

Language and nationality disambiguation pages